The Wunambal (Unambal), also known as Wunambal Gaambera, Uunguu (referring to their lands), and other names, are an Aboriginal Australian people of the northern Kimberley region of Western Australia.

People
The Wunambal were, according to Norman Tindale, "perhaps among the most venturesome of Australian aborigines". The Wunambal bands who excelled in this were the Laiau and the Wardana.

The Wunambal, Worrorra, and Ngarinyin peoples form a cultural bloc known as Wanjina Wunggurr. The shared culture is based on the dreamtime mythology and law whose creators are the Wanjina and Wunggurr spirits, ancestors of these peoples. The Wunambal Gaambera Aboriginal Corporation represents the Wunambal Gaambera people; Uunguu refers to their "home", or country.

Social organisation
The Wunambal were organised into groups:
 Laiau
 Wardana (now extinct)
 Winjai (eastern)
 Kanaria (northeastern group near Port Warrender)
 Peremanggurei

A people with an ethnonym identical to that of the Carson River Wilawila, known also as the Tjawurungari/Tawandjangango, inhabited the Osborne Islands. They spoke a dialect variety of the language spoken by the Kambure.

Language

Country
The traditional lands of the Wunambal are around York Sound. Their inland extension reached about –, as far as the divide of the King Edward River. They were at Cape Wellington peninsula, Port Warrender, and somewhat further east. The Worrorra lay to the south; the Ngarinjin to their west, while on their north-western frontier were the Kambure.

Native title
As part of the same native title claim lodged in 1998 by Wanjina Wunggurr RNTBC known as the Dambimangari claim, which included claims for the three peoples in the Wanjina Wunggurr cultural bloc, referred to as Dambimangari, Uunguu and Wilinggin (see above), the "Uunguu and Uunguu B" parts of the claims were determined on 23 May 2011. The Unguu land stretches along the coastal waters from the Anjo Peninsula in the north, includes the waters of Admiralty Gulf and York Sound, down to Coronation Island. Inland, it includes parts of the Mitchell River National Park and the Prince Regent National Park.

In both of these the people were represented by the Kimberley Land Council.

The Wanjina Wunggurr RNTBC acts on behalf of the Ngarinyin/Wilinggin, Worrora/Dambimangari, and Wunambal Gaambera native title holders with regard to their rights and interests.

Boab tree carving, 1820

The crew did not meet any of the local Wunambal people while they were stranded there for 18 days doing the repairs, but made observations in his journal on the other signs of life that they observed. He described not only bark shelters on the beach, but more larger and more substantial buildings on top of the hill. He also observed the remnants of sago palm nuts, which were commonly eaten along the coast. 

Under orders from King, the ship's carpenter was instructed to inscribe "Mermaid 1820" on an ancient boab tree, which still stands today. The Wunambal Gaambera people administer permits for visitors to the area in which the tree is located, and the Uunguu Rangers, a team of Indigenous rangers, build and maintain facilities such as a boardwalk to help protect the environment.

Alternative names
 

 Jamindjal, Jarmindjal (Worrorra exonym meaning "northeasterners"
 Kanaria
 Laiau (Institut islands)
 Peremanggurei(head of Prince Frederick Harbour)
 Unambal, Unambalnge
 Wanambal
 Wardana (Montlivet islands)
 Winjai
 Wonambul, Wumnabal, Wunambulu
 Wunambulu, Wunambullu

References

Citations

Sources

Further reading
  Text may be copied from this source, which is available under a Attribution 4.0 International  (CC BY 4.0) licence.

Aboriginal peoples of Western Australia
Kimberley (Western Australia)